The South Korean boy band Pentagon held their debut showcase "The Museum of Pentagon" on October 16, 2016. They completed their five sets of "Pentagon Tentastic Mini Concerts" from 2016 to 2018. In 2019, Pentagon embarked on their first world tour entitled 2019 Pentagon World Tour "Prism" in April.

Concerts

Tours

Fan meetings

Showcases

Joint tours and concerts, music festivals and television performances

Guerilla concerts, special events and mini lives

Notes

References

External links

P
P
P
P
P
Concert tours